Biaka may refer to:
 Aka people, also known as BiAka, a nomadic Mbenga pygmy people of central Africa
 Biaka language, a language of Papua New Guinea
 Biaka (butterfly), a genus of butterflies
 Lalbiakhlua Jongte, commonly known as Biaka